Muhammad Waseem (born 12 February 1996) is a Pakistani-born cricketer who plays for the United Arab Emirates national cricket team.

Personal life
Waseem was born in Pakistan, growing up in the town of Multan . He qualified to play for the UAE in April 2021 by meeting the ICC's three-year residency requirements.

Franchise career
On 3 February 2021, in the 2021 T10 League, Waseem equalled the record for the fastest fifty in a T10 cricket match, doing so in twelve balls. In May 2021, he was called into the Multan Sultans squad as a replacement player for the 2021 Pakistan Super League.

International career
In October 2021, he was named in the UAE's Twenty20 International (T20I) squad for the 2021 Summer T20 Bash tournament. He made his T20I debut on 5 October 2021, for the UAE against Namibia. Five days later, in the UAE's match against Ireland, Waseem scored his first century in T20I cricket, with 107 not out from 62 balls.

In November 2021, he was named in the UAE's One Day International (ODI) squad for the 2021 Namibia Tri-Nation Series. In February 2022, he was also named in the UAE's ODI squad for their series against Oman. He made his ODI debut on 5 February 2022, for the UAE against Oman.

References

External links
 

1994 births
Living people
Emirati cricketers
United Arab Emirates One Day International cricketers
United Arab Emirates Twenty20 International cricketers
People from Khanewal District
Pakistani emigrants to the United Arab Emirates
Pakistani expatriate sportspeople in the United Arab Emirates